The 24th Metro Manila Film Festival was held in 1998.

It was a clean sweep for José Rizal in the 1998 Metro Manila Film Festival. The movie won all but one of the eighteen awards at stake, which is the Best Actress given to Alice Dixson for her portrayal in Sambahin ang Ngalan Mo.

Entries

Winners and nominees

Awards
Winners are listed first and highlighted in boldface.

Multiple awards

References

External links

Metro Manila Film Festival
MMFF
MMFF